The 19th Army was an army level command of the German Army in World War I.  It was formed in France on 4 February 1918 from the former South Army command.  It served exclusively on the Western Front and was dissolved on 24 January 1919.

History 
19th Army was one of three armies (along with 17th Army and 18th Army) formed in late 1917 / early 1918 with forces withdrawn from the Eastern Front.  They were in place to take part in Ludendorff's German spring offensive.  The Germans had realised that their only remaining chance of victory was to defeat the Allies before the overwhelming human and matériel resources of the United States could be deployed. They also had the temporary advantage in numbers afforded by nearly 50 divisions freed by the Russian withdrawal from the war (Treaty of Brest-Litovsk).  It was still in existence when the war ended, serving on the Western Front as part of Heeresgruppe Herzog Albrecht von Württemberg.

Order of Battle, 30 October 1918 
By the end of the war, the majority of the units assigned were lower quality Landwehr Divisions indicative of the relatively quiet sector that the Army was operating in.

Commanders 
19th Army had the following commanders:

Glossary 
Armee-Abteilung or Army Detachment in the sense of "something detached from an Army".  It is not under the command of an Army so is in itself a small Army.
Armee-Gruppe or Army Group in the sense of a group within an Army and under its command, generally formed as a temporary measure for a specific task.
Heeresgruppe or Army Group in the sense of a number of armies under a single commander.

See also 

19th Army (Wehrmacht) for the equivalent formation in World War II
German Army order of battle, Western Front (1918)

References

Bibliography 
 
 

19
Military units and formations established in 1918
Military units and formations disestablished in 1919